Langdon is an unincorporated community in Meadow Township, Clay County, Iowa, United States.

History
Langdon's population was 16 in 1915, and 50 in 1925.

References

Unincorporated communities in Clay County, Iowa
Unincorporated communities in Iowa